Theodore Martin "T.M." Stikeleather (1848–1934) was elected to the North Carolina House of Representatives in 1894 and to the State Senate in 1900 from the Populist Party. In the Senate he represented the 27th district, which included Iredell, Davie and Yadkin counties.

Family
Theodore Martin Stikeleather was the son of John Alexander Stikeleather and Rhoda Lee Gunn. He is listed in Volume 3 of Levi Branson's North Carolina Agricultural Almanac as a farmer in Turnersburg in 1890. T. M. was born on August 28, 1848 and died in Statesville, North Carolina on June 25, 1934 as the result of complications from facial cancer. He is buried in Oakwood Cemetery, Statesville, N. C. He had 8 children with Amelia Louise "Amie" Stimpson, plus two other wives.

Populist Party
During the 1890s, North Carolina witnessed a political revolution as the newly formed Populist Party joined with the Republicans to unseat conservative Democrats. Focusing on political transformation, electoral reform, and new economic policies to aid poor and struggling farmers, the Populists and their coalition partners took power at all levels in the only southern state where Populists gained statewide office. For a brief four years, the Populists and Republicans gave an object lesson in progressive politics in which whites and African Americans worked together for the betterment of the state and the lives of the people.

References

 
 
 

North Carolina Populists
North Carolina state senators
1934 deaths
1848 births
People from Statesville, North Carolina